Anne Antoine, Comte d’Aché (23 January 1701, Marbeuf – 11 February 1780) was a French naval officer who rose to the rank of vice admiral. He is best known for his service off the coast of India during the Seven Years' War, when he led the French fleet at the Battle of Cuddalore and  Battle of Pondicherry. He also failed to provide adequate naval support to French troops attempting to capture Madras in 1759. After he received rumours of a British attack on the major Indian Ocean naval base Mauritius he did not go to the aid of the French forces in Pondicherry which was under siege. Pondicherry, the French capital in India, subsequently surrendered leaving the French with no influence upon the Indian Subcontinent. After the war he retired to Brest where he died in 1780.

See also
 France in the Seven Years' War
 Great Britain in the Seven Years' War

References

1701 births
1780 deaths
People from Eure
Counts of France
French military personnel of the Seven Years' War
French Navy admirals